Heinz Fischer GColIH OMRI RSerafO GCollSE (born 9 October 1938) is a former Austrian politician. He took office as President of Austria on 8 July 2004 and was re-elected for a second and last term on 25 April 2010, leaving office on 8 July 2016.  Fischer previously served as minister of science from 1983 to 1987 and as president of the National Council of Austria from 1990 to 2002. A member of the Social Democratic Party of Austria (SPÖ), he suspended his party membership for the duration of his presidency.

Early life
Fischer was born in Graz, Styria, which had recently become part of Nazi Germany, following Germany’s annexation of Austria in March 1938. Fischer attended a grammar school which focused on humanities and graduated in 1956. He studied law at the University of Vienna, earning a doctorate in 1961. In 1963, at the age of 25, Fischer spent a year volunteering at Kibbutz Sarid, northern Israel. Apart from being a politician, Fischer also pursued an academic career, and became a professor of Political Science at the University of Innsbruck in 1994.

Political career

Fischer was a member of the Austrian parliament, the National Council, from 1971, and served as its president from 1990 to 2002. From 1983 to 1987 he was minister of science in a coalition government headed by Fred Sinowatz.

First term as president
In January 2004 Fischer announced that he would run for president to succeed Thomas Klestil.  He was elected on 25 April 2004 as the candidate of the opposition Social Democratic Party. He polled 52.4 per cent of the votes to defeat Benita Ferrero-Waldner, then foreign minister in the ruling conservative coalition led by the People's Party.

Fischer was sworn in on 8 July 2004 and took over office from the college of presidents of the National Council, who had acted for the president following Klestil's death on 6 July.

Second term as president

In April 2010, Fischer was re-elected president of Austria, winning a second six-year term in office with almost 79% of the votes. The voter turnout of merely 53.6% was a record low. Around a third of those eligible to vote voted for Fischer, leading the conservative daily Die Presse to describe the election as an "absolute majority for non-voters". The reasons behind the low turnout may have been that pollsters had predicted a safe victory for Fischer (past Austrian presidents running for a second term had always won) and that the other large party, ÖVP, had not nominated a candidate of their own, and had not endorsed any of the three candidates. Prominent ÖVP members, unofficially but in public, even suggested to cast a blank vote, which 7% of the voters did.

Personal life
 
Fischer identifies himself as agnostic and as a social democrat. He and Margit Binder married in 1968. The couple have two grown children.

Despite being members of opposing parties, Fischer was close friends with former ÖVP politician Sixtus Lanner.

He enjoys mountaineering and has been president of the Austrian Friends of Nature for many years.

Honours and awards

National Honours

Federal Order 

 2004  Grand Star of Honour of the Decoration for Services to the Republic of Austria (Austria)

State Honours 

 2008 Ring of Honour of the Province of Styria
 2008 Freedom of the City of Graz

Awards 

 2009 Florianiplakette of the Austrian Federal Fire Association in gold

Foreign Honours

Foreign Orders 

1993  Knight Grand Cross of the Order of Merit of the Italian Republic (Italy)
 2005  Grand Collar of the Order of Prince Henry (Portugal)
 2005  Grand Cross of the Order of Isabella the Catholic (Spain)
 2006  Grand Cross of the Order of the Order of the White Rose of Finland (Finland)
 2006  Grand Cross with Collar of the Order of Merit of the Republic of Hungary (Hungary)
 2006  Collar of the Order pro merito Melitensi (Sovereign Military Order of Malta)
 2007  Knight Grand Cross with Collar of the Order of Merit of the Italian Republic (Italy)
 2007  Grand Cross of the Royal Norwegian Order of St. Olav (Norway)
 2007  Knight of the Royal Order of the Seraphim (Sweden)
 2009  Grand Cross with Golden Chain of the Order of Vytautas the Great (Lithuania)
 2009  Grand Collar of the Order of Saint James of the Sword (Portugal)
 2009  Grand Collar of the Order of the White Lion (Czech Republic)
 2012  Collar of the Order of Merit (Chile)
 2013  Grand Cross of the Legion of Honour (France)
 2013  Knight of the Order of the Gold Lion of the House of Nassau (Luxembourg)
 2014  National Flag Order (Albania)
 2015  Grand Collar of the Order of the Condor of the Andes (Bolivia)
 2016  Order of the Balkan Mountains (Bulgaria)

Foreign Awards 

 2008 Honorary Doctorate of Law Faculty of the University of Tel Aviv
 2009 Honorary Doctorate from the Ukrainian Academy of Sciences

See also
 List of national leaders
 Politics of Austria

References

|-

1938 births
Austrian agnostics
Candidates for President of Austria
Living people
Members of the National Council (Austria)
Politicians from Graz
Presidents of Austria
Presidents of the National Council (Austria)
Social Democratic Party of Austria politicians
University of Vienna alumni
Austrian people of Jewish descent

Grand Collars of the Order of Prince Henry
Grand Collars of the Order of Saint James of the Sword
Collars of the Order of the White Lion
Grand Croix of the Légion d'honneur
Grand Crosses of the Order of Merit of the Republic of Hungary (civil)
Grand Crosses with Golden Chain of the Order of Vytautas the Great
Knights Grand Cross of the Order of Isabella the Catholic
Knights Grand Cross with Collar of the Order of Merit of the Italian Republic
Recipients of the Grand Star of the Decoration for Services to the Republic of Austria
Recipients of the Order pro Merito Melitensi